Vitalij Valerievich Durkin (born 2 September 1979) is a Russian badminton player. In 2015, he competed at the European Games in Baku, Azerbaijan.

Achievements

BWF Grand Prix 
The BWF Grand Prix has two levels, the Grand Prix and Grand Prix Gold. It is a series of badminton tournaments sanctioned by the Badminton World Federation (BWF) since 2007. The World Badminton Grand Prix sanctioned by International Badminton Federation since 1983.

Men's doubles

Mixed doubles

  BWF Grand Prix Gold tournament
  BWF & IBF Grand Prix tournament

BWF International Challenge/Series 
Men's doubles

Mixed doubles

  BWF International Challenge tournament
  BWF International Series tournament

References

External links 
 

1979 births
Living people
Sportspeople from Novosibirsk
Russian male badminton players
Badminton players at the 2015 European Games
European Games competitors for Russia